Luigi Mondelli (born March 24, 1972) is a Brazilian-American Brazilian jiu-jitsu practitioner based in Danbury, Connecticut. He is the head coach of American Top Team's Connecticut program under the umbrella of Ricardo Libório and the co-founder and head coach of his own program, KORE. Mondelli is a five-time Panamerican champion and a three-time world masters champion.

Mondelli began training in Brazilian jiu-jitsu in 1991 under the instruction of Adalberto "Buda" de Souza and Crézio de Souza at their school in Petropolis, until attaining the rank of purple belt. When his family relocated to Rio de Janeiro, Mondelli continued his training, eventually receiving his black belt in December 2001. Most recently Mondelli was awarded his fourth degree by Adalberto "Buda" de Souza in 2015.

In addition to winning multiple championships, Mondelli has graduated a number of successful black belts and professional MMA fighters, notably Glover Teixeira. Mondelli oversees the curriculum of his Kore program from its headquarters in Danbury, designed to link the disciplines of Brazilian jiu-jitsu, wrestling and judo in a fluid and practical method of application.

Brazilian jiu-jitsu career

Luigi Mondelli began competing in Brazil during his teenage years and progressed through the ranks in a tough and competitive environment in Rio de Janeiro, Brazil, first winning the Masters Purple Belt Category in 1999 and later the brown belt division, before winning the Panamerican Championship five times. Mondelli is also a three-time world champion as a black belt in the Senior division in both the gi and no-gi categories.

The Pit 

Mondelli has been a guest instructor and coach at The Pit, a martial arts and MMA camp started by John Hackleman in 1986. The prominent camp has produced several prominent fighters such as Chuck Liddell and Glover Teixeira among others. Mondelli credits John Hackleman as being one of his mentors and a valuable source of knowledge in the course of his development.

Seminars, education and self-defense

Additionally, Mondelli provides self-defense and combat training to a broad range of military and law enforcement personnel. Mondelli has performed hundreds of seminars and demonstrations and continues to be active in the education and assistance of safety and self-defense training for veterans, active duty personnel and law enforcement across the United States and around the world.

KORE BJJ and American Top Team Connecticut

The Danbury location of American Top Team serves as the headquarters for KORE BJJ and is where Mondelli spends much of his time developing his students. The location offers programs from children ages 4 and up, all the way through competitive and professional world-class Brazilian Jiu-Jitsu instruction. It is not uncommon for wrestlers and judoka (judo practitioners) to spend time in the program to round out their skill set, since the KORE curriculum is geared towards proficiency in all types of grappling. Classes are offered every day of the week, with the exception of Sundays, and are almost universally led by a black-belt level instructor, very often including Luigi Mondelli, himself.

References

Brazilian practitioners of Brazilian jiu-jitsu
1972 births
Living people
Sportspeople from Danbury, Connecticut
Sportspeople from Rio de Janeiro (city)